Oleg Zherebtsov (born 21 May 1968) is a Russian businessman, founder of hypermarkets "Lenta" and "Norma", the world sailing champion in 2011 at 12 meters class, the founder of the Association SB20 in Russia, and General Director of the Pharmaceutical Company Solopharm.

Oleg was born in Bryansk, Russia. 

Zherebtsov Oleg founded "Lenta" on 25 October 1993 in St. Petersburg. In 2007 were opened 10 hypermarkets (three of them in St. Petersburg), in 2008 — 8. By this time in Russia there were already 32 existing hypermarket. In May 2007 the European Bank for reconstruction and development with $125 million bought a share in "Lenta", estimated at 11–14% of the share capital. At the end of December 2008, the company "Lenta" was included in the list of companies that would receive state support during the economic crisis. In October 2009 Oleg Zherebtsov sold his part in "Lenta" to the consilium investment funds TPQ and VTB Capital.

Oleg Zherebtsov founded the company "Norma" in 2005. In 2007, it opened its first store in St. Petersburg. In 2011 Oleg Zherebtsov sold his assets in the company "Norm".

In 2010 Oleg Zherebtsov created the company "Solopharm" for the production of high-tech innovative pharmaceutical products that comply with international GMP standards of quality. I

Oleg Zherebtsov started sailing in 2007. In 2008 Zherebtsov participated in a race around the world - Volvo Ocean Race, as the sole sponsor and Bowman sailor, in 2009 and 2010, received first place in the championship of Russia in the national class Em-ka, in 2011, Zherebtsov became world champion in sailing in the class 12,

References

Russian businesspeople in retailing
1968 births
Living people
Volvo Ocean Race sailors
Russian male sailors (sport)